Solomon Grundy may refer to:

"Solomon Grundy" (nursery rhyme), a 19th-century children's nursery rhyme
Solomon Grundy (character), a villain in some DC comics series, most notably Batman and Green Lantern
Solomon Grundy (band), a grunge band from Seattle, Washington
"Solomon Grundy" (song), by English group The Foundations on their 1969 album Digging The Foundations

See also
Grundy (disambiguation)
Solomon Gundy, a Jamaican fish pâté
Solomon Gundie, a ska song based on the nursery rhyme
Salmagundi, a mixed food dish that may be the etymological source for Solomon Grundy